Connie Post is an American poet. She served as the first poet laureate of Livermore, California, from 2005 to 2009. She hosted multiple poetry shows including Wine and Words, Ravenswood, and Valona Deli Second Sunday Poetry Series. Post is widely published and the author of seven books of poetry. She was the recipient of over 70 poetry awards, including the 2014 Lyrebird Award, 2012 Aurorean Editor's chapbook prize, 2018 Liakoura Award, the Caesura Award, and the 2016 Crab Creek Poetry Award. She was succeeded as poet laureate by Cher Wollard, Kevin Gunn, and Cynthia Patton.

Works

Collections

Prime Meridian (Glass Lyre Press, 2020)
Floodwater (Glass Lyre Press, 2014)

Chapbooks
 And When the Sun Drops (Finishing Line Press, 2012) 
 Trip Wires (Finishing Line Press, 2010)

See also 

 List of municipal poets laureate in California

References

Living people
American women poets
Municipal Poets Laureate in the United States
People from Livermore, California
Year of birth missing (living people)
21st-century American women